Monolopia stricta is a species of flowering plant in the family Asteraceae known by the common name Crum's monolopia. It is endemic to central California, where it grows in the Central Valley and its flanking mountain ranges and foothills. It open grasslands and chaparral, often in clay soils. It is an annual herb producing a slender, sometimes branching stem up to about 80 centimeters tall. It is usually somewhat woolly in texture. The inflorescences at the ends of stem branches bear small hemispheric flower heads. The golden ray florets are usually about 1 to 2 centimeters long, but specimens from the western San Joaquin Valley have smaller florets.

External links
Jepson Manual Treatment
USDA Plants Profile
Flora of North America
Photo gallery

Madieae
Endemic flora of California
Flora without expected TNC conservation status